Eucalyptus brassiana, commonly known as Cape York gum, gum-topped peppermint or as karo in PNG is a small to medium-sized tree that is native to northern Queensland and PNG. It has rough, hard, fissured bark on the trunk and smooth greyish bark on the branches, narrow lance-shaped adult leaves, flower buds in groups of seven, white flowers and hemispherical or cup-shaped fruit.

Description
The bark on the lower part of the trunk but sometimes extending to the branches is rough, hard and dark grey to black. The bark above is smooth grey over white to creamy yellow. They are the same colour glossy green on both surfaces.

Taxonomy and naming
Eucalyptus brassiana was first formally described in 1977 by Stanley Thatcher Blake from a specimen he collected at Cooktown in 1958. The description was published in the journal Austrobaileya. The specific epithet (brassiana) honours Leonard John Brass, who collected plant specimens on Cape York Peninsula.

Distribution and habitat
Cape York red gum grows in woodland and open forest on seasonally flooded flats, on rocky slopes and undulating plains. It occurs on the north-eastern side of the Cape York Peninsula and as far south as Helenvale. It is also found in south-western Papua New Guinea.

See also
List of Eucalyptus species

References

Rosids of Australia
brassiana
Myrtales of Australia
Plants described in 1977
Taxa named by Stanley Thatcher Blake